1970 Emperor's Cup Final was the 50th final of the Emperor's Cup competition. The final was played at National Stadium in Tokyo on January 1, 1971. Yanmar Diesel won the championship.

Overview
Yanmar Diesel won their 2nd title, by defeating defending champion Toyo Industries 2–1. Yanmar Diesel was featured a squad consisting of Kunishige Kamamoto, Daishiro Yoshimura and Eizo Yuguchi.

Match details

See also
1970 Emperor's Cup

References

Emperor's Cup
Emperor's Cup Final
Cerezo Osaka matches
Sanfrecce Hiroshima matches
Emperor's Cup Final
Emperor's Cup Final